Paul Pierre Cayard (born May 19, 1959) is an American yachtsman and professional sailor.   He has competed at multiple world championship level sailing events, including the America's Cup, the Whitbread Round the World Race, the Volvo Ocean Race and the Olympic Games. In 1998 he was selected as the US Rolex Yachtsmen of the Year. He has won seven world championships, twice participated in the Olympic Games and seven times in the America's Cup.   In 2011 he was elected into the US Sailing Hall of Fame.

Biography
Paul Cayard was born in San Francisco, California.  He began sailing in 1967, at the age of eight.  He graduated in 1981, with a degree in Business Management from San Francisco State University.   He speaks three languages: English, French and Italian.  He enjoys flying and holds a pilots certification with instrument rating for single engine aircraft.  Of all his sailing accomplishments, he counts his 1988 Star Class World Championship as his most prized victory.

Currently, Cayard serves as Executive Director of the US Olympic Sailing Team. From 2019-2020, he served as Chairman of the Board for St. Francis Yacht Club. He is an ambassador for Rolex, the One Ocean Foundation and Vice President of the International Star Class. 

Cayard is a member of four international yacht clubs; St. Francis Yacht Club, San Francisco Yacht Club, Yacht Club Costa Smeralda and Yacht Club de Monaco.

Sailing career 
From an early age Cayard showed great promise as a sailor and by his early teens was successfully sailing high performance dinghies such as the International 505 and Laser. As Cayard grew and became more proficient in sailing, he gained the notice of Tom Blackaller who invited Cayard to crew for him on his Star class sailboat.  Blackaller would become an influential mentor and the Star Class would become a lifelong passion for Cayard.

In 1984, Cayard was selected as an alternate in the Olympic Games for the USA sailing team.  Sailing in the Star Class, he won the silver medal at the pre-Olympic regatta in 2003, going on to finish 5th at the 2004 Summer Olympic Games in Athens.

Cayard has competed in a broad range of ocean racing events with an impressive record. He won the 1994 Kenwood Cup, the 1994 and 1996 Sardinia Cup and the 1995 Admirals Cup. His top achievement in this arena was becoming the first American to win the Whitbread Round the World in 1997-1998 as skipper of EF Language. He beat out ten other yachts for the prize over a course of 32,000 miles (51,500 km).

In 2005-2006, Cayard competed in the Volvo Ocean Race as skipper of the Pirates of the Caribbean syndicate sponsored by The Walt Disney Company in reference to the movie of the same name. Cayard Sailing Inc. managed the team which won the final leg into Gothenburg to finish the overall race in 2nd place.

In 2007, Paul Cayard and Russell Coutts announced the launch of the World Sailing League in partnership with internationally renowned Portuguese sports promoter, João Lagos. The World Sailing League (WSL) was to have been held at premier sailing locations around the world with the series winner receiving $2 million in prize money.

In 2009, Cayard joined Artemis Racing owned by Torbjörn Törnqvist.  Cayard was the Skipper of the Louis Vuitton Trophy team and Tactician onboard TP52 Artemis (www.artemisracing.com).  Artemis Racing became the Challenger of Record for the 34th America's Cup in 2010 and Cayard was CEO.

America's Cup 
Cayard's first America's Cup was in 1983 aboard Tom Blackaller's Defender as a jib trimmer. Defender finished third in the defender selection series. For the 1987 America's Cup series, Cayard moved up to tactician and alternate helmsman on Blackaller's new boat USA, which lost out to Dennis Conner's Stars & Stripes for the right to challenge for the cup.

For the 1992 America's Cup, Cayard was manager and skipper of Il Moro di Venezia from Italy, a syndicate backed by Raul Gardini. In 1991, he won the first ever International America's Cup Class world championship. Over the months long challenger selection series, Cayard's team beat out seven other teams from six other countries to win the 1992 Louis Vuitton Cup and gain the right to challenge for the America's Cup. Part of the challenge included protests where Cayard successfully protested the employment of a bowsprit on the New Zealand challenge.

Though Il Moro di Venezia was outclassed in the America's Cup races by the faster America³, Cayard's expertise in sailing provided some memorable moments. In the second race of the series, his yacht won the start and maintained a small lead for the entire race. He employed classic match racing tactics throughout the race and at the downwind finish managed to beat America³ by three seconds, producing what was at the time the smallest winning margin in America's Cup history. Il Moro however, went on to lose this series 4–1.

In 1995, Cayard joined an American effort for the America's Cup with Team Dennis Conner Stars & Stripes as primary helmsman. Though Stars & Stripes was noticeably slower than other boats on the defender series, the syndicate managed to win the 1995 Citizen Cup for the right to defend the Cup. In an unprecedented move, Team Dennis Conner decided to use the faster yacht Young America from the PACT 95 syndicate to defend the Cup. Cayard and this syndicate ended up losing the Cup 5–0 to Team New Zealand, who had won the 1995 Louis Vuitton Cup.

With the change in venue and hemisphere for the Cup, the next America's Cup was not held until 2000. For the 2000 America's Cup, Cayard formed his own syndicate with backing from a number of sponsors and named it AmericaOne. The sponsoring yacht club was St. Francis Yacht Club of San Francisco. This syndicate competed against 14 challengers from 10 nations for the right to challenge for the Cup. AmericaOne reached the finals of the 2000 Louis Vuitton Cup racing against Prada for the right to challenge against Team New Zealand for the 2000 America's Cup. The final over the best of nine races was hotly contested, with neither yacht ever winning by more than two minutes. Prada won the first race, and AmericaOne the second. Prada went on to win the next two races, putting AmericaOne at a 3-1 disadvantage. AmericaOne then proceeded to win the next three races in a row and appeared on the brink of winning the Louis Vuitton Cup. However, equipment fatigue and failure proved decisive, several spinnakers were blown out, and Prada ended up winning the next two races and the series, 5–4, earning the right to challenge for the Cup.  Prada ultimately lost in the America's Cup, 5–0 to the defender Team New Zealand.

Following the conclusion of the 2000 America's Cup, Cayard recommended to the AmericaOne syndicate board of trustees that the syndicate should not compete for the 2003 America's Cup, citing significant financial and recruiting obstacles. Assets of AmericaOne were eventually sold to Larry Ellison who founded the Oracle Racing syndicate, later joining forces with BMW Racing to form Oracle BMW Racing, with Cayard as skipper. Cayard later was moved out of the skipper position into an administrative position and ultimately left the syndicate.

In March 2007, Cayard was involved in the 2007 America's Cup as Technical Advisor to Desafio Espanol 2007. Cayard also commentated on the 2007 Louis Vuitton Cup and on the 2007 America's Cup for La7, the Italian broadcast rights holder.  On 12 October 2007, Cayard announced that he was joining Desafio Espanol as Sports Director for the 33rd America's Cup.

For the 33rd America's Cup, Cayard provided commentary for Eurosport and in 2009 joined Torbjorn Tornqvist's sailing on Artemis Racing for the TP52 and Louis Vuitton Trophy regattas. Cayard also helmed RC44 Katusha on the RC44 Championship Tour from 2010–2012.  For the 34th America's Cup, Cayard was the CEO of Artemis Racing, the Challenger of Record.

In 2020, Paul Cayard was the first sailor to be inducted into the Class of 2020 for the Bay Area Sports Hall of Fame, (BASHOF)

Achievements 

 Won the El Toro class North American championship in the under 18 category in 1975.
 Won the Star class world championship in 1988.
 Won the Maxi class world championship in 1988 aboard Il Moro di Venezia III.
 Won the 1989 One Ton class world championship.
 Won the 1991 50-foot world championship aboard Abracadabra in Japan.
 1991 Yachting magazine Yachtsman of the Year.
 Won the Louis Vuitton Cup in 1992.
 1992 Rothmans Yachtsman of the Year.
 Won the Citizens Cup in 1995 for the right to defend the America's Cup.
 Won 1994 and 1996 Sardinia Cup (ocean racing)
 Won 1994 Kenwood Cup (ocean racing)
 Won the 1995 Admiral's Cup (ocean racing)
 Won the 1996 International Level Class 40 world championship.
 Won the 1999 Steinlager Cup.
 Won the 1997/98 Whitbread Round the World Race (now known as the Volvo Ocean Race) as skipper of the Swedish entry EF Language.
 1998 Rolex Yachtsman of the Year.
 Won 2002 IMS world championship in Capri, Italy.
 2005-2006 Skippered 'Pirates of the Caribbean' in the Volvo Ocean Race, placing 2nd overall.
 Tactician on board John Kilroy's Samba Pa Ti, winner of the Farr 40 North American Championships 2004, US National Championships 2004, Pacific Coast Championships 2004, and West Coast Season Championships 2004.
 2010 Became CEO of Artemis Racing, Challenger of Record for the 34th America's Cup, which is backed by Torbjörn Tornqvist. 
 2011 Inducted into the National Sailing Hall of Fame in San Diego, CA.
 2018 Star World Championship, Bronze
 2019 Inducted into Bay Area Sports Hall of Fame

See also
 Italy at the America's Cup

References

 Record of world championships won
 2000 Louis Vuitton Cup finals results

External links 
 
 AmericaOne website
 
 
 
 
 
 
 
 

1959 births
American male sailors (sport)
Artemis Racing sailors
Living people
Oracle Racing sailors
Il Moro Challenge sailors
Sailors at the 2004 Summer Olympics – Star
Star class world champions
US Sailor of the Year
Volvo Ocean Race sailors
1983 America's Cup sailors
1987 America's Cup sailors
1992 America's Cup sailors
1995 America's Cup sailors
2000 America's Cup sailors
2003 America's Cup sailors
2013 America's Cup sailors
World champions in sailing for the United States
San Francisco State University alumni
Olympic sailors of the United States